Akas may refer to:

Hruso people, an ethnic group of India
Aka people, an ethnic group of Central Africa
Chima Akas, Nigerian footballer

See also 
 Acas (disambiguation)
 Ackas, a town in Finland
 Akash (disambiguation)
 Aka (disambiguation)